Events from the year 1983 in Canada.

Incumbents

Crown 
 Monarch – Elizabeth II

Federal government 
 Governor General – Edward Schreyer
 Prime Minister – Pierre Trudeau
 Chief Justice – Bora Laskin (Ontario)
 Parliament – 32nd

Provincial governments

Lieutenant governors 
Lieutenant Governor of Alberta – Francis Charles Lynch-Staunton  
Lieutenant Governor of British Columbia – Henry Pybus Bell-Irving (until July 15) then Robert Gordon Rogers 
Lieutenant Governor of Manitoba – Pearl McGonigal 
Lieutenant Governor of New Brunswick – George Stanley 
Lieutenant Governor of Newfoundland – William Anthony Paddon 
Lieutenant Governor of Nova Scotia – John Elvin Shaffner 
Lieutenant Governor of Ontario – John Black Aird 
Lieutenant Governor of Prince Edward Island – Joseph Aubin Doiron 
Lieutenant Governor of Quebec – Jean-Pierre Côté
Lieutenant Governor of Saskatchewan – Irwin McIntosh (until July 6) then Frederick Johnson

Premiers 
Premier of Alberta – Peter Lougheed  
Premier of British Columbia – Bill Bennett 
Premier of Manitoba – Howard Pawley 
Premier of New Brunswick – Richard Hatfield
Premier of Newfoundland – Brian Peckford 
Premier of Nova Scotia – John Buchanan 
Premier of Ontario – Bill Davis 
Premier of Prince Edward Island – James Lee 
Premier of Quebec – René Lévesque
Premier of Saskatchewan – Grant Devine

Territorial governments

Commissioners 
 Commissioner of Yukon –  Douglas Bell
 Commissioner of Northwest Territories – John Havelock Parker

Premiers 
Premier of the Northwest Territories – George Braden
Premier of Yukon – Chris Pearson

Events
January 1 - The metric system of weights and measures is officially adopted by the federal government although Imperial units are still used.
January 17 - Saskatchewan MLA Colin Thatcher resigns as Minister of Energy and Mines after several well-publicised disputes with premier Grant Devine.
January 21 - Joann Thatcher, ex-wife of Saskatchewan MLA Colin Thatcher, is murdered in her Regina home.  Colin would later be convicted of the crime.
February 1 - Pay television begins operating in Canada.
February 15 - The Tamarack Review ceases publication.
April 1 - The spending mandate by Premier Bill Bennett's government expires without a sitting of the House or the calling of an election: constitutional interregnum and crisis ensues.
April 5 - Lieutenant Governor of British Columbia Henry Pybus Bell-Irving summons Premier Bennett to Government House.  The L-G issues emergency warrants to cover spending until a snap election.
June 2 - Air Canada Flight 797 makes an emergency landing in Cincinnati, Ohio - a fire kills 23 of 41 passengers on board.
June 9 - Bill 101, protecting the French language in Quebec is ruled unconstitutional.
June 11 - Brian Mulroney replaces Joe Clark as leader of Progressive Conservative Party of Canada.
June 17 - Saint John, New Brunswick Princess Diana and Prince Charles start their tour of Canada
June 19 - BC Place in Vancouver opens.
July 23 - Gimli Glider: Air Canada flight 143 makes an emergency landing in Gimli, Manitoba.
October 1 - North Atlantic Salmon Conservation Organization is established.
November 17 - The Western Grain Transportation Act is passed.
December 23 - Jeanne Sauvé is appointed Canada's first female Governor General.

Full date unknown
 Canada agrees to allow testing of American cruise missiles in the west.
 The Point Lepreau Nuclear Generating Station, the first nuclear power plant in the Maritimes.

Arts and literature

New books
A Time for Judas - Morley Callaghan
Unearthing Suite - Margaret Atwood
Seagull on Yonge Street - bill bissett
"Happy Endings" - Margaret Atwood

Awards
See 1983 Governor General's Awards for a complete list of winners and finalists for those awards.
Books in Canada First Novel Award: W.P. Kinsella, Shoeless Joe
Gerald Lampert Award: Diana Hartog, Matinee Light
Pat Lowther Award: Rhea Tregebov, Remembering History
Stephen Leacock Award: Morley Torgov, The Outside Chance of Maximilian Glick
Vicky Metcalf Award: Claire Mackay

Film
Graham Greene makes his film debut in Running Brave
David Cronenberg's The Dead Zone is released
A film is made of Farley Mowat's Never Cry Wolf, named Never Cry Wolf.

Sport
March 5 - Steve Podborski wins Gold at the World Cup of Skiing.
March 13 - Saskatchewan Huskies won their only University Cup by defeating the Concordia Stingers 6 to 2, the Final game was played at Moncton Coliseum
May 14 - Portland Winter Hawks become the First American team to win the Memorial Cup by defeating the Oshawa Generals 8 to 3. 
October 1 - Tulsa Roughnecks won their only Soccer Bowl by defeating the Toronto Blizzard in Soccer Bowl '83  played at  BC Place Stadium in Vancouver 
May 17 - New York Islanders won their Fourth (consecutive and last to date) Stanley Cup by defeating the Edmonton Oilers. Montreal's Mike Bossy was awarded his Second(consecutive) Conn Smythe Trophy
November 15 - Rocky Johnson becomes the Third Canadian to win the World Wrestling Federation's Tag Team Championship (with Tony Atlas as the "Soul Patrol") by defeating the Wild Samoans in Allentown, Pennsylvania
November 19 - Calgary Dinos won their First Vanier Cup by defeating the Queen's Golden Gaels 31 to 21 in the 19th Vanier Cup played at Varsity Stadium in Toronto
November 27 - Toronto Argonauts won their Tenth (and First since 1952) Grey Cup by defeating the BC Lions 18 to 17 in the 71st Grey Cup played at the Lions own BC Place Stadium in Vancouver

Births
January 3 – Joe Bartoch, swimmer
January 6 – Cristina Rosato, actress  
January 9 – Chris Getzlaf, American football player; brother of Anaheim Ducks captain Ryan Getzlaf  
January 11 – Matthew Palleschi, soccer player
February 2 – Jordin Tootoo, ice hockey player
February 6 – Myron Wolf Child, youth activist, public speaker and politician (d.2007)
February 9 – Keith Beavers, swimmer
February 14 – Sasha Andrews, soccer player
February 15 – Russell Martin, baseball player
February 28 – Marie-Pierre Gagné, synchronized swimmer
March 3 
 Olia Berger, judoka
 Marie-Pier Boudreau Gagnon, synchronized swimmer
March 10 – Kyle Marshall, Canadian animator, storyboard artist, director and writer
April 1 – John Axford, baseball player
April 2 – Owen Fussey, ice hockey player
April 4 – Doug Lynch, ice hockey player
April 7 – Kyle Labine, actor
April 8 – Crystal Gilmore, artistic gymnast
April 11 – Joanna Douglas, actress
April 12 – Anthony Sedlak, chef, and the host of Food Network Canada's The Main (d.2012)
April 28 – Dan Mangan, singer-songwriter
May 4 – Jesse Moss, actor
May 20 – Dan Blackburn, ice hockey player
June 6 – Lyndie Greenwood, actress
June 14 – Torrance Coombs, actor 
June 16 – Lisa Yamanaka, voice actress  
June 22 – Sheena Lawrick, softball player
June 26 – Jessika Dubuc, synchronized swimmer
June 30 – Katherine Ryan, comedian and actress
July 6 
 Leo Carroll, volleyball player
 Christine Firkins, actress
 Gregory Smith, actor
July 12 – Krystin Pellerin, actress 
July 14 – Katrina Chen, politician  
July 21 
 Vinessa Antoine, actress
 Tara Campbell, water polo player
August 10 – Mathieu Roy, professional ice hockey player 
September 10 – Joey Votto, baseball player
September 18 – Giulio Scandella, ice hockey player
September 27 – Jay Bouwmeester, ice hockey player
October 3 – Meghan Heffern, actress
October 5 – Noot Seear, fashion model and actress 
October 16 – Kenny Omega, pro wrestler 
October 21 
 Christine Moore, NDP politician
 Charlotte Sullivan, actress
November 4 – Melanie Kok, rower
November 10 – Fred Cheng, Canadian-born Hong Kong singer
November 24 – Karine Vanasse, actress and producer
November 28 – Courtney Rush, professional wrestler 
December 19
 Laura Pomeroy, swimmer
 Matt Stajan, ice hockey player
December 22 – Joe Dinicol, actor
December 24 – Daniel Stein, water polo player
date unknown – Anita Sarkeesian, Canadian-American feminist
date unknown – Jane McGregor, actress

Deaths

January to June
January 21 - JoAnn Wilson, murder victim (b.1939)
March 16 - Fred Rose, politician and trade union organizer (b.1907)
May 1 - George Hodgson, swimmer and double Olympic gold medalist (b.1893)
May 10 - Leonard Marsh, social scientist and professor (b.1906)
May 25 - Jean Rougeau, professional wrestler and bodyguard of Québec Premier René Lévesque (b.1929)
June 2 - 
Thomas John Bentley, politician (b.1891)
Stan Rogers, folk musician and songwriter (b.1949)
June 12 - Norma Shearer, Academy Award–winning actress (b.1902)
June 27 - Alden Nowlan, poet, novelist, playwright and journalist (b.1933)

July to December
July 11 - Ross Macdonald, novelist (b.1915)
July 13 - Gabrielle Roy, author (b.1909)
July 29 - Raymond Massey, actor (b.1896)
September 21 - Andrew Brewin, lawyer and politician (b.1907)
October 20 - Yves Thériault, author (b.1915)
November 24 - Graham Spry, broadcasting pioneer, business executive, diplomat and socialist (b.1900)
December 2 - Fifi D'Orsay, actress (b.1904)
December 23 – Edythe Shuttleworth, mezzo-soprano (b.1907)

See also
 1983 in Canadian television
 List of Canadian films of 1983

References

 
Years of the 20th century in Canada
Canada
1983 in North America